The Suzuki graph is a strongly regular graph with parameters .  Its automorphism group has order 896690995200 and contains as a subgroup of order 2 the Suzuki sporadic group.  It is named for Michio Suzuki.

External links
  A. E. Brouwer's website: the Suzuki graph
 MathWorld: Suzuki graph

Individual graphs
Regular graphs
Strongly regular graphs